Gonghe (Mandarin: 共和镇) is a town in Huangzhong District, Xining, Qinghai, China. In 2010, Gonghe had a total population of 29,323: 14,846 males and 14,477 females: 6,168 aged under 14, 21,259 aged between 15 and 65 and 1,896 aged over 65.

References 

Township-level divisions of Qinghai
Xining
Towns in China